Thamnolia juncea is a species of whiteworm lichen in the family Icmadophilaceae. It was described as a new species in 2004 by Norwegian lichenologist Rolf Santesson. It is found in Papua New Guinea, where it grows on the ground in subalpine or alpine grassland.

References

Pertusariales
Lichen species
Lichens described in 2004
Lichens of New Guinea
Taxa named by Rolf Santesson